Lacrimal crest may refer to;

 Anterior lacrimal crest
 Posterior lacrimal crest